The 1996–97 Division 2 season, organised by the LFP was won by LB Châteauroux and saw the promotions of LB Châteauroux and Toulouse FC, whereas FC Perpignan, FCO Charleville, SAS Épinal and Stade Briochin were relegated to National.

22 participating teams

 Amiens
 Beauvais
 Charleville
 Châteauroux
 Épinal
 Gueugnon
 Laval
 Le Mans
 Lorient
 Louhans-Cuiseaux
 Martigues
 Mulhouse
 Niort
 Perpignan
 Red Star
 Saint-Brieuc
 Saint-Étienne
 Sochaux
 Toulon
 Toulouse
 Troyes
 Valence

League table

Recap
 Promoted to L1 : LB Châteauroux, Toulouse FC 
 Relegated to L2 : SM Caen, AS Nancy, Lille OSC, OGC Nice
 Promoted to L2 : Nîmes Olympique, ES Wasquehal 
 Relegated to National : FCO Charleville, SAS Épinal
 Relegated to lower divisions : FC Perpignan, Stade Briochin (Banned during the season)

Results

Top goalscorers

External links
RSSSF archives of results

Ligue 2 seasons
French
2